WJHS may refer to:

 WJHS (FM), a radio station (91.5 FM) licensed to Columbia City, Indiana, United States
 West Johnston High School in Benson, North Carolina
 Walter Johnson High School in North Bethesda, Maryland
 West Jordan High School in West Jordan, Utah
West Jefferson High School (Louisiana) in Jefferson Parish, Louisiana
West Jefferson High School (Ohio) in West Jefferson, Ohio